A list of animated television series first aired in 1988.

Anime television series first aired in 1988

See also
 List of animated feature films of 1988
 List of Japanese animation television series of 1988

References

Television series
Animated series
1988
1988
1988-related lists